Frederick George Jones (22 April 1918 – 27 April 1977) was an  Australian rules footballer who played with Hawthorn in the Victorian Football League (VFL).

Jones was recruited from the Traralgon Football Club  where he was runner-up in the 1940 Gippsland Football League best and fairest award.

Notes

External links 

1918 births
1977 deaths
Australian rules footballers from Victoria (Australia)
Hawthorn Football Club players